Kitab  is an annual international festival of literature, poetry, media and arts. Every year, it takes place in a different Indian city.

Literary festivals in India
Annual events in India